Rucheyki is a rural locality (a selo) in Krasnoselskoye Rural Settlement, Yuryev-Polsky District, Vladimir Oblast, Russia. The population was 2 as of 2010.

Geography 
Rucheyki is located on the Koloksha River, 7 km northwest from Yuryev-Polsky (the district's administrative centre) by road. Afineyevo is the nearest rural locality.

References 

Rural localities in Yuryev-Polsky District